Defending champion Peter Norfolk defeated David Wagner in the final, 7–6(7–5), 6–1 to win the quad singles wheelchair tennis title at the 2009 Australian Open.

Draw

Final

Round robin
Standings are determined by: 1. number of wins; 2. number of matches; 3. in two-players-ties, head-to-head records; 4. in three-players-ties, percentage of sets won, or of games won; 5. steering-committee decision.

References 

Wheelchair Quad Singles
2009 Quad Singles